South Korea-based boy group Stray Kids have released three studio albums (two Korean and one Japanese), four compilation albums, one reissue, eleven extended plays (nine Korean and two Japanese), two single albums, and twenty-eight singles. As of October 2022, Stray Kids has sold over 10 million album shipments, consisting of 9,400,000 copies of Korean releases and 820,000 of Japanese releases. The International Federation of the Phonographic Industry (IFPI) ranked Stray Kids as the seventh best-selling artist of 2022.


Albums

Studio albums

Compilation albums

Reissues

Extended plays

Single albums

Singles

Other charted songs

Videography

Video albums

Music videos

Other videos

Notes

See also 
 List of songs recorded by Stray Kids

References

External links 
  
  

Discographies of South Korean artists
K-pop music group discographies
Discography